Dust Clearing is a religious ceremony done in Muslim territories. It is a ritual for cleansing, brooming, washing, and perfume-spraying in special places like holy tombs, mosques, martyrs' graves, Kaaba, Imam Reza shrine, libraries, Masjid al-Haram, etc.

Resources 

 
 . 
Iranian culture
Saudi Arabian culture
Islamic festivals
Islamic terminology
 .